The La Lorgnette Stakes is a Thoroughbred horse race run annually since 2000 at Woodbine Racetrack in Toronto, Ontario, Canada. Held during the third week of September, the ungraded stakes race is open to three-year-old fillies. It is raced over a distance of  miles on Polytrack synthetic dirt and currently offers a purse of $94,513.

The race is named in honour of Windfields Farm's Champion filly La Lorgnette who in 1985 won Canada's most prestigious race, the Queen's Plate.

Records
Speed  record: 
 1:43.32 - Leigh Court (2013)

Most wins by an owner:
 No owner has won this race more than once.

Most wins by a jockey: 
 3 - Patrick Husbands (2001, 2003, 2014)

Most wins by a trainer: 
 3 - Josie Carroll (2003, 2011, 2013)
 2 - Robert P. Tiller (2001, 2014)

Winners of the La Lorgnette Stakes

References
 The La Lorgnette Stakes at Pedigree Query

Ungraded stakes races in Canada
Flat horse races for three-year-old fillies
Recurring sporting events established in 2000
Woodbine Racetrack